Mount Warren is a mountain located in the Catskill Mountains of New York south of South Kortright. Bovina Mountain is located west-northwest of Mount Warren.

References

Mountains of Delaware County, New York
Mountains of New York (state)